Live from the Forum MMXVIII is the third live album and a concert film from the Eagles. It records the concerts at the Forum in Inglewood, California that took place over three nights in September 2018. It is the first release to feature new band members Deacon Frey and Vince Gill alongside Don Henley, Joe Walsh and Timothy B. Schmit. Deacon, son of the late former band member Glenn Frey, and Gill joined the band following the death of the elder Frey in 2016. It was released on October 16, 2020, in a variety of formats, including CD, DVD and Blu-ray.

Background
In 2016, after Glenn Frey died, Don Henley decided that the band would not play again.  However, Henley reversed his decision and announced in March 2017 that the Eagles would perform in two festivals organized by their manager Irving Azoff that featured classic rock bands, starting with The Classic West festival held at Dodger Stadium in July that year. Henley brought in Frey's son Deacon to perform with the remaining members of the Eagles in these shows after he saw Deacon perform Glenn Frey's songs at his memorial service. According to Henley, in order for the band to continue, "the only way it felt justified to me was to have family blood in the band". They were also joined by Vince Gill who performed at the Kennedy Center Honors in December 2016 where the Eagles were one of the honorees. Gill "fit like a glove", according to Henley. After the festival performances in Los Angeles and New York, the band announced that a North American tour featuring Deacon Frey and Vince Gill would begin in March 2018 in Chicago, to be followed by a world tour in 2019. Another world tour scheduled for 2020, titled the Hotel California 2020 Tour, was postponed due to the COVID-19 pandemic.

The North American tour included a three-night stop (September 12, 14 and 15, 2018) at the Forum in Los Angeles, California, where the concerts were recorded. The setlist included many of the best-known songs of the Eagles, but also hits recorded by individual members, such as Henley's "The Boys of Summer", Walsh's "Life's Been Good" and Gill's "Don't Let Our Love Start Slippin' Away". The band performed 26 songs every night apart from the show on September 14 when they performed 27 songs, adding "The Long Run" to their second encore. The recordings of the concerts were compiled into a 26-song live album and concert film. The only song on their setlist omitted on this release is "Witchy Woman", with "The Long Run" from September 14 added instead.

The film of the concert was directed by Nick Wickham and filmed  on 14 4K cameras. It premiered on ESPN on July 5, 2020, the first time a concert was shown on the sports network.

The recordings were released for sale on October 16, 2020, in several audio and video formats and in various configurations, including a super deluxe box set with Blu-ray, two CDs and four LPs.

Former Eagles member, Randy Meisner, was present in the audience according to Timothy B. Schmit.

Track listing

CD 1

CD 2

Personnel

Eagles
Don Henley – vocals, drums, guitar, percussion
Joe Walsh – vocals, guitar, keyboards
Timothy B. Schmit – bass guitar, vocals
Deacon Frey - vocals, guitar
Vince Gill - vocals, guitar

Eagles backing band
Michael Thompson - keyboards, accordion, vocals 
Will Hollis - keyboards, vocals, musical director
Scott Crago - drums, percussion
Steuart Smith - guitar, vocals

Horns
Michael Boscarino 
Michael Cottone
Tom Evans 
Jamie Hovorka 
David Mann

Strings
Milo Deering 
Kristine Kruta 
Christiana Liberis 
Laura Sacks
Erica Swindell

Production

Album
Audio produced by Don Henley 
Recording and mixing by Jeff Balding
Digital editing by Richard F.W. Davis 
Mastering by Bob Ludwig 

Concert film 
Nick Wickham –  director
Vance Burberry – director of photography 
Tom Woolcott – film editor 
Sharon Everett, Guy Harding and Clark Eddy – other editors

Irving Azoff and Sheira Rees-Davies – executive producers 
Art direction and design by Jeri Heiden and Ryan Corey
Produced by Ned Doyle, Karim Karmi and Sheira Rees-Davies

Charts

Weekly charts

Year-end charts

References

Eagles (band) live albums
Eagles (band) video albums
2020 video albums
2020 live albums